Paul John Tagliabue (born November 24, 1940) is an American lawyer who was the commissioner of the National Football League (NFL). He took the position in 1989 and served until September 1, 2006. He had previously served as a lawyer for the NFL. Tagliabue also served as Chairman of Board of Directors of Georgetown University from 2009 to 2015.

Background 
Tagliabue was born in Jersey City, New Jersey, the third of four sons of Charles and May Tagliabue. He is of Italian descent. Tagliabue received an athletic scholarship to play basketball at Georgetown University and was captain of the 1961–62 team. He graduated in 1962 as president of his senior class, a Rhodes Scholar finalist and a Dean's List graduate.

Tagliabue graduated from New York University School of Law in 1965. He has received honorary degrees from Colgate University and Northeastern University.

From 1969 to 1989, Tagliabue practiced law with the Washington, D.C. firm Covington & Burling.

National Football League 
After serving as a lawyer for the NFL, Tagliabue was selected by NFL owners to succeed Pete Rozelle as Commissioner of the NFL in 1989.

Expansion of the league 
During his tenure as commissioner, the NFL expanded from 28 teams to 32. New franchises were announced in 1993 to begin play in 1995 in Charlotte and Jacksonville. Subsequent moves by other teams resulted in a 31st team being added in Cleveland in 1999; this team, though technically an expansion team, inherited the name, colors and history (including all team and individual records) from the Cleveland Browns, who had relocated to Baltimore in 1996 and been renamed the Baltimore Ravens. The 32nd franchise was the Houston Texans, added in 2002.

NFL in Europe 
The NFL continued to play pre-season games in Europe with the American Bowl series. Paul Tagliabue started a spring developmental league, the World League of American Football (WLAF), with seven teams in North America, plus three in Europe. The European teams dominated in 1991, the first season. After the second season, 1992, in which US-based teams played in the World Bowl, the World League was shut down as it was unsuccessful in the US. In 1995, the spring league returned as the NFL Europe with six teams in Europe. When Tagliabue retired, five teams were based in Germany. Tagliabue's successor Roger Goodell shut down the NFL Europe after the 2007 season. but replaced it with the NFL International Series in October 2007 with regular season games in London.
In 2022 the NFL played its first ever Regular Season Game in mainland Europe. The game was played in Munich, Germany on November 13, 2022.

Team movements 
In 1995, Los Angeles lost both its franchises, as the Los Angeles Rams relocated to St. Louis, and the Raiders returned to Oakland. In 1996, the Browns moved to Baltimore, under a new name, as indicated above. In 1997, the Houston Oilers relocated to Tennessee, for one year in Memphis and another year using Vanderbilt Stadium as their home field. (The team changed its name from the Oilers to the Titans upon moving to their permanent stadium in Nashville.)

Response to September 11 attacks 
Two days after the terrorist attacks on the World Trade Center and the Pentagon, Tagliabue announced that the games scheduled for the upcoming weekend were cancelled, citing the magnitude of the events and security concerns. It was the first time the league canceled an entire week's slate of games since the 1987 NFL strike.

A week later, it was announced that the postponed games would be added to the end of the regular season, pushing the Super Bowl into February for the first time.

Legacy 
Tagliabue has been praised for these politically-related actions taken as NFL commissioner:
 He took a stand against the State of Arizona for refusing to establish a state holiday honoring Martin Luther King Jr., like other states had done. In 1993, Super Bowl XXVII was to be held for the first time in Arizona, but after an election, Arizona rejected establishment of a Martin Luther King state holiday. Subsequently, Tagliabue moved the Super Bowl to Pasadena; Arizona would finally host Super Bowl XXX in 1996.
 Forcefully and successfully promoting the return of the Saints to New Orleans after the disruption of their 2005 season in the aftermath of Hurricane Katrina.  Tagliabue is credited with convincing Saints owner Tom Benson to abandon any effort to move the team to San Antonio and with making the Saints' return to Louisiana a league priority.

Post-NFL career 
Tagliabue returned to Covington & Burling where he serves as senior counsel.

In 2008, Tagliabue was selected to serve a three-year term as chairman of Georgetown University's board of directors.

Tagliabue has also been honored for his work with gay rights group PFLAG.

He has served on the Advisory Board of The Iris Network, a nonprofit blindness rehabilitation agency in Portland, Maine.

In 2012, Tagliabue was appointed by current NFL commissioner Roger Goodell to hear the appeals of the players suspended in the New Orleans Saints bounty scandal. Tagliabue affirmed Goodell's findings of the investigation but overturned all players' suspensions.

On September 4, 2014, Tagliabue was named to the executive board of DC2024, a group trying to bring the 2024 Summer Olympics to Washington, D.C.

Awards 
Tagliabue won the 1992 Eagle Award from the United States Sports Academy.  The Eagle Award is the Academy's highest international honor and was awarded to Tagliabue for his significant contributions to international sport.

On January 15, 2020 Tagliabue was elected to the Pro Football Hall of Fame Centennial Class of 2021.

References

External links 

1940 births
Living people
Lawyers from Washington, D.C.
Georgetown Hoyas men's basketball players
National Football League commissioners
People from Jersey City, New Jersey
American people of Italian descent
New York University School of Law alumni
People associated with Covington & Burling
American men's basketball players
Pro Football Hall of Fame inductees
20th-century American lawyers